Long Bình is the name of several places in Vietnam. It may refer to:

Long Bình, a ward of Thủ Đức, Ho Chi Minh City
Long Bình, Đồng Nai, a ward of Biên Hòa
Long Binh Post, a US military base at Long Bình ward, 1965–1975
Long Bình Jail, a U.S. military stockade at Long Binh Post, 1966–1973 
Long Bình, An Giang, a township of the An Phú District
Long Bình, Hậu Giang, a rural commune of Long Mỹ town